The Klammspitze is a double-summit mountain in Bavaria, Germany, north of Linderhof.

The higher top, Großer Klammspitz is 1,924 metres above sea level, the lower one, Kleiner Klammspitz is 1,882 metres high.

Mountains of Bavaria
Ammergau Alps
Mountains of the Alps